Mila Robert Gergova (Bulgarian: Мила Роберт Гергова; born September 6, 1996), known professionally as Mila Robert, is a Bulgarian singer, songwriter, painter and actress. She is the daughter of Vanya Shtereva.

Early life and career 
Mila Robert was born on September 6, 1996 in Sofia, Bulgaria. Her mother is the singer and actress Vanya Shtereva and her father the basketball player Robert Gergov. She began singing and playing the guitar at the age of 13, she also plays on ukulele and kazoo.

In 2013, when Robert was 16, she auditioned for the second season of X Factor Bulgaria with the song ''Wicked Game'' by Chris Issak but after her second live show she decided to leave the show saying ''My goal was not to win, my goal was to have fun, but obviously i was wrong, after coming to X Factor, I clarified my goals.'' after some people speculated that she was there just because of her mother's fame.

Robert's first single is the cover of the song ''Signal'' by Emil Dimitrov in 2017. In the same year, Robert wins the award for debuting artist by BG Radio because of that song. In 2018, Robert released her first original song ''Nashe si e, Sashe''. She gained popularity, especially in the social media after ''Nashe si e, Sashe''. Also in 2018 she made a cover of Ivana's song ''Neshto Netipichno'', naming it ''Kvartalna Kruchma''.

Mila Robert is also a painter. She sells her paintings in Instagram. She is also organizing exhibitions with her paintings.

In 2019, Robert took part in Sofia Pride along with Mihaela Fileva, Galena, Netta Barzilai and more.

Education 
In 2019, Robert graduated from Krastyo Sarafov National Academy for Theatre and Film Arts with a Bachelor’s Degree in Drama Theatre Acting in the class of professor Ivan Dobchev who is a Bulgarian filmmaker.

During the COVID-19 pandemic 
During the quarantine, Robert did two online concerts but she admitted that she regrets that decision. In an interview she said that her most listened artist during the quarantine was Dua Lipa.

In 2020, Robert was offered a role in the short movie by the bulgarian film director Petar Krumov. The movie was first named ''The Soup'' (''Супата''), but later the name was changed to ''Hunger'' (''Глад''). The movie is part of a special event organized by the International Short Film Festival ''IN THE PALACE''.

Later that year, her new song "Vsichko Ryazko Svetva" was released, which is the first single from her debut album "Egotrip".

Discography

Albums

Singles

Filmography

References 

1996 births
Living people
People from Sofia
Bulgarian pop singers
21st-century Bulgarian women singers
X Factor (Bulgarian TV series)
Bulgarian LGBT rights activists
Bulgarian actresses